Andrew Esealuka (born 20 December 1985) is a Nigerian footballer. He played for Aris Limassol.

References

1985 births
Living people
Nigerian footballers
Nigerian expatriate footballers
Cypriot First Division players
APEP FC players
Aris Limassol FC players
Expatriate footballers in Cyprus
Association football midfielders